The Philadelphia Wings are a lacrosse team based in Philadelphia playing in the National Lacrosse League (NLL). The 2013 season was the 27th in franchise history.

The Wings finished with a 7-9 record, good for 3rd place in the Eastern division. They made the playoffs in consecutive years for the first time since 2002, but fell to the defending (and eventual) Champion Rochester Knighthawks 10-8 in the division semi-final.

Regular season

Conference standings

Game log
Reference:

Playoffs
Reference:

Roster

Transactions

Trades

Entry Draft
The 2012 NLL Entry Draft took place on October 1, 2012. The Wings made the following selections:

See also
2013 NLL season

References

Philadelphia Wings seasons
2013 in lacrosse
Phil